In accordance with an Indian Ministry of Railways decision, Indian Railways switched from its previous four-digit numbering system for passenger trains to a five-digit system on December 20, 2010.

First digit

The first digit of the train number indicates the type of train:
0 (0XXXX): Special trains, such as summer, holiday and exam specials and trains to clear large passenger loads

Train Numbers starting with first two digits as 12 or 22 are super fast trains. Remaining are express trains.

1 or 2 (1XXXX or 2XXXX): Long-distance trains, such as superfast express trains or express trains
3 (3XXXX): Kolkata Suburban Railway
4 (4XXXX): Other suburban trains, such as the Chennai and Delhi Suburban Railways and the Hyderabad Multi-Modal Transport System
5 (5XXXX): Passenger trains with conventional coaches
6 (6XXXX): MEMU service
7 (7XXXX): Diesel multiple units and railcars
8 (8XXXX): Suvidha Express trains
9 (9XXXX): Mumbai Suburban Railway

Second digit
If the first digit is 0, 1 or 2, the second digit indicates the railway zone:
0 (10XXX or 00XXX): Konkan Railway
0 (20XXX): It is a new nomenclature used by railways to designate superfast or premium category trains
1 (Y1XXX): Central Railway trains, some West Central and North Central Railway trains
2 (Y2XXX): The Rajdhani, Shatabdi, Jan Shatabdi, Garib Rath, Duronto, Sampark Kranti and Gatimaan Express and all other superfast trains
3 (Y3XXX): Eastern Railway and East Central Railway trains
4 (Y4XXX): Northern Railway trains, some North Central and North Western Railway trains
5 (Y5XXX): Northeast Frontier and North Eastern Railway trains
6 (Y6XXX): Southern Railway and some South Western Railway trains
7 (Y7XXX): South Central and some South Western Railway trains
8 (Y8XXX): South Eastern, South East Central and East Coast Railway trains
9 (Y9XXX): Western and some West Central and North Western Railway trains

If the first digit is 3, the second digit indicates:
0 to 7 (Eastern Railway zone):
31XXX: From Sealdah towards 
32XXX: From Sealdah towards Dankuni
33XXX: From Sealdah towards Barasat
34XXX: From Sealdah towards Ballygunge Junction (Sealdah South section)
35XXX From Barddhaman Junction towards Katwa Junction
36XXX: From Howrah towards Dankuni
37XXX: From Howrah towards Bandel Junction
8 or 9 (38XXX or 39XXX, South Eastern Railway zone): May indicate destination(s) or branch line(s) 

If the first digit is 4, the second digit indicates:
0 to 4 (Southern Railway zone):
40ZXX: See Third digit section below
41XXX: From Chennai Beach to Velachery
42XXX: From Moore Market to Gummidipundi
43AXX: See Third digit section below
5 or 6 (45XXX, 46XXX): Northern Railway zone
7 (47XXX): South Central Railway zone

If the first digit is 5, 6 or 7, the second digit identifies the railway zone where the train is operated or maintained:
0 (E0XXX): Konkan Railway
1 (E1XXX): Some Central and West Central Railway zone trains
2 (E2XXX): Some Northern, North Central, North Western, North Eastern and East Central Railway zone trains
3 (E3XXX): All Eastern and some East Central Railway zone trains
4 (E4XXX): Some Northern, North Central and North Western Railway zone trains
5 (E5XXX): Northeast Frontier and some North Eastern Railway zone trains
6 (E6XXX): Some Southern and South Western Railway zone trains
7 (E7XXX): South Central and some South Western Railway zone trains
8 (E8XXX): South Eastern, South East Central and East Coast Railway zone trains
9 (E9XXX): Western and some West Central and North Western Railway zone trains

If the first digit is 8, the second digit is 2. If the first digit is 9,
the second digit identifies the railway zone where the train is operated or maintained:
0 to 4 (Western Railway zone):
90XXX: Originating and terminating at Virar
91XXX" Originating and terminating at Vasai Road-Bhayander92XXX: Originating and terminating at Borivali93XXX: Originating and terminating at Malad-Goregaon94XXX: Originating and terminating at Andheri-Bandra-Mumbai Central-CSTM5 to 9 (Central Railway zone):95XXX: Fast trains96XXX: Slow trains travelling beyond Kalyan97XXX: Slow trains to the Harbour line98XXX: Slow trains to the Trans-Harbour line99XXX: Slow trains not travelling beyond Kalyan

Third digit
If the first digit is 0, 1 or 2 and the second digit is 2, the third digit identifies the railway zone where the train is maintained, except for 0 (Y20XX, the Shatabdi and Jan Shatabdi Express in all zones):1 (Y21XX): Central and some West Central zone trains2 (Y22XX): Some Northern, North Central, North Western and Southern zone trains3 (Y23XX): Eastern and East Central zone trains4 (Y24XX): Some Northern, North Central and North Western zone trains5 (Y25XX): Northeast Frontier and North Eastern zone trains6 (Y26XX): Some Southern and South Western zone trains7 (Y27XX): South Central and some South Western zone trains8 (Y28XX): South Eastern, South East Central and East Coast zone trains9 (Y29XX): Western, some West Central and North Western zone trains

If the second digit is other than 2, the second and third digits identify the railway division where the train is operated and maintained.

01: 
10: -
11: -
12: 
13: Mumbai CR-Kolhapur
14: -
16: 
30: 
31: 
32: 
33: 
34: 
35: 
40: 
41: 
42: 
43: 
45: 
46: 
47: 
48: 
50: 
51: 
52: -
53: -
54: 
55: 
56: 
57: -
58: Lumding-Alipurduar
59: 
60: 
61: 
62: 
63: 
65: 
66: -
67: 
68: 
70: 
72: 
73: 
74: 
75: 
76: 
77: 
78: 
80: 
81: 
82: 
83: 
84: 
85: 
86: -
90: 
91: 
92: 
93: 
94: 
95: 
96: 
97: 
98: 
99: 

If the first digit is 4 and the second digit is 0, the third digit indicates service between:
400XX: Chennai Beach and Tambaram
401XX: Chennai Beach and Tambaram
403XX: Chennai Beach and Tambaram
404XX: Chennai Beach and Tambaram
405XX: Chengalpattu and Tambaram
406XX: Chengalpattu and Tambaram
407XX: Chengalpattu and Tirumalpur
408XX: Chengalpattu and Kanchipuram

If the second digit is 3, the third digit indicates service between:
430XX: Chennai Central and Avadi
431XX: Chennai Central and Pattabiram
432XX: Chennai Central and Thiruvalluvar
434XX: Chennai Central and Arakkonam
435XX: Chennai Central and Thiruttani
436XX: Chennai Beach and Avadi
438XX: Chennai Beach and Arakkonam

If the second digit is 5 or 6, the third digit indicates the direction of travel:
4N0XX: DUK section
4N1XX: Delhi Shahdara–Shamali section
4N2XX: Ghaziabad–Meerut City section
4N5XX, 4N6XX: Ghaziabad–Hapur section, towards Aligarh
4N7XX: Shakur Basti–Rohtak section
4N8XX: Ring Railway

If the first digit is 5, 6 or 7, the second and third digits indicate the division where the train is operated and maintained:

01: 
10: -
11: -
12: 
13: -Kolhapur
14: -
16: 
20: -
21: -
22: -
23: 
24: 
25: 
30: 
31: 
32: 
33: 
34: 
35: 
40: 
41: 
42: 
43: 
45: 
46: 
47: 
48: 
50: 
51: 
52: -
53: -
54: 
55: 
56: 
57: -
58: -
59: 
60: 
61: 
62: 
63: 
65: 
66: -
67: 
68: 
70: 
72: 
73: 
74: 
75: 
76: 
77: 
78: 
80: 
81: 
82: 
83: 
84: 
85: 
86: -
90: 
91: 
92: 
93: 
94: 
95: 
96: 
97: 
98: 
99: 

If the first digit is 8, the third digit identifies the zone where the train is operated or maintained:
1 (821XX): Central and West Central zones, Konkan Railway and some North Central zone trains
2 (822XX): As authorized by the Railway Board
3 (823XX): Eastern zone and a some East Central zone trains
4 (824XX): Northern zone and some North Central and North Western zone trains
5 (825XX): Northeast Frontier and North Eastern zone and some East Central zone trains
6 (826XX): Southern zone and some South Western zone trains
7 (827XX): South Central and some South Western zone trains
8 (828XX): South Eastern, South East Central and East Coast zone trains
9 (829XX): Western and some North Western zone trains

Fourth and fifth digits
The fourth and fifth digits are random numbers, making each five-digit train number unique. However, on the Delhi Suburban Railway the fourth digit (4NXPX) indicates the following: 
0 to 2: MEMU
3 to 5: Electric multiple unit
6 and 7: Conventional passenger coach
8: Diesel multiple unit
9: Other rolling stock

See also
Wagon numbering system in India

References

Indian railway-related lists
Rail transport operations